Diplomatic Immunity 2 is the second studio album by American hip hop collective The Diplomats. The album was released on November 23, 2004, through Koch Records.

Track listing

Charts

Weekly charts

Year-end charts

References

2004 albums
The Diplomats albums
E1 Music albums
Diplomat Records albums
Sequel albums